Church Point High School (CPHS) is a senior high school serving students in grades 9–12 in Church Point, Louisiana and other communities, such as Richard, Branch, and Mire. It is a part of the Acadia Parish School Board.

Its mascot is the Louisiana black bear.

Athletics
Church Point High athletics competes in the LHSAA.

list of sports:

M baseball
M/W basketball
Cheerleading
Dance team
M football
M/W golf
M/W powerlifting
W softball
M/W athletics
W volleyball
M wrestling

References

External links
 Church Point High School

Schools in Acadia Parish, Louisiana
Public high schools in Louisiana